The 2001 Verizon Tennis Challenge was a men's tennis tournament played on outdoor clay courts at the Atlanta Athletic Club in Johns Creek, Georgia in the United States and was part of the International Series of the 2001 ATP Tour. It was the 16th and last edition of the tournament and ran from April 23 through April 29, 2001. Unseeded Andy Roddick, who entered on a wildcard, won the singles title.

Finals

Singles

 Andy Roddick defeated  Xavier Malisse 6–2, 6–4
 It was Roddick's first singles title of his career.

Doubles

 Mahesh Bhupathi /  Leander Paes defeated  Rick Leach /  David Macpherson 6–3, 7–6(9–7)
 It was Bhupathi's 1st title of the year and the 18th of his career. It was Paes' 1st title of the year and the 21st of his career.

References

External links
 ITF tournament edition details

Verizon Tennis Challenge
Verizon Tennis Challenge
Verizon Tennis
Verizon Tennis Challenge
Verizon Tennis Challenge